Jädraås is a locality situated in Ockelbo Municipality, Gävleborg County, Sweden with a population of 220 in 2010.

References 

Populated places in Ockelbo Municipality
Gästrikland